Musele or museles may refer to:

Musele (knife), a throwing knife used in eastern Gabon
Alexios Musele (disambiguation), list of people with the surname Musele and the given name Alexios
 Museles, a wine produced in Xinjiang, China

See also
Muselet, a wire cage that fits over the cork of a bottle
Muscle (disambiguation)
Mussel